Sky Mali, is a private airline operating in Mali. It serves local destinations, from its operations base at Modibo Keita International Airport, near Bamako, the Malian capital city.

Location

History
Sky Mali was established in 2020. It received an Air Operator Certificate, from the National Aviation Agency of Mali, on 22 July 2020. The airline began commercial operations during the third quarter of calendar year 2020. Its inaugural flight was on 29 September 2020, from Bamako to Kayes.  As of February 2021, the load factors on the Bamako–Gao and Bamako–Kayes routes were in excess of 80 percent.

In June 2021, Sky Mali announced the addition of their first international routes: Bamako-Cotonou-Libreville (launched 9 August), and Bamako-Kayes-Dakar (launched 28 July).

Overview
With the cessation of service by Air Mali (2005), there had been no scheduled domestic air service inside Mali, since 2012. With backing of the Al Sayegh Group of Abu Dhabi, Sky Mali was established and began commercial operations during the second half of 2020. As of February 2021, five Malian destinations are served, including the airline's hub at Bamako International Airport.

Ownership and associated companies
At its inception, Sky Mali SA, "a public limited company incorporated under Malian law", was a 100 percent subsidiary of Al Sayegh Group, an Emirati investment holding company, based in Abu Dhabi. At that time, it was expected that other private investors and possibly the Government of Mali would become investors in the business.

Destinations
As of August 2021, Sky Mali maintained scheduled services to the following destinations:

Mali
Bamako – Bamako International Airport (Hub)
Gao – Gao International Airport
Kayes – Kayes Airport
Mopti – Mopti Airport
Timbuktu – Timbuktu Airport

Fleet
As of January 2023, Sky Mali maintained the following aircraft:

See also

 Airlines of Africa 
 List of airlines of Mali

References

External links
 

Airlines of Mali
Airlines established in 2020
Bamako
2020 establishments in Mali